Eleonora Grigor'yevna Eksanishvili (Yeksanishvili) (February 11, 1919 – January 5, 2003) was a Georgian pianist, music educator and composer. Her compositions include two children's operas, a concerto for piano and orchestra, and a Piano Quintet.  She has published an article which is featured in the book Sergei Rachmaninoff: a bio-bibliography on Rachmaninoff's visit to Tbilisi, the capital of Georgia. Eksanishvili died in January 2003 at the age of 83.

References

1919 births
2003 deaths
20th-century classical composers
20th-century classical pianists
20th-century women composers
Classical composers from Georgia (country)
Classical pianists from Georgia (country)
Music educators
Opera composers from Georgia (country)
Women classical composers
Women classical pianists
Women music educators
Women opera composers
20th-century women pianists